The name Ferdie has been used for three tropical cyclones in the Philippines by PAGASA in the Western Pacific Ocean. It replaced the name Frank after its devastation in 2008.

Typhoon Vicente (2012) (T1208, 09W, Ferdie)
Typhoon Meranti (2016) (T1614, 16W, Ferdie)
Tropical Storm Mekkhala (2020) (T2006, 07W, Ferdie)

Pacific typhoon set index articles